Tarvisio Boscoverde is a railway station serving the town of Tarvisio, in the region of Friuli-Venezia Giulia, in Northern Italy. The station is managed by Rete Ferroviaria Italiana (RFI). Train services are operated by Trenitalia and ÖBB.

History

The station opened on 26 November 2000 as the current northern terminus of the rebuilt Alpine Pontebbana line from Udine railway station. From Tarvisio, the Rudolf Railway runs northwards across the border with Austria towards Villach Hauptbahnhof and the Southern Railway main line. 

The station replaced the former Tarvisio Centrale and Tarvisio Città railway stations, opened in 1879. Tarvisio Centrale is still used as a terminus for bus services from Udine. The former Tarvisio–Ljubljana Railway to Jesenice railway station in Slovenia has been closed to traffic since 1967.

Train services
The station is served the following international service(s):
Intercity services (RailJet) Vienna - Klagenfurt - Villach - Udine - Treviso - Venice
Night train (Nightjet) Vienna - Villach - Venice - Bologna - Rome
Night train (Nightjet) Vienna - Villach - Venice - Verona - Milan
Night train (Nightjet) Munich - Tarvisio - Udine - Treviso - Venice
Night train (Nightjet) Vienna - Linz - Salzburg - Villach - Udine - Treviso - Venice
as well as by regional rail: 
Regional services (REX) Villach - Tarvisio - Carnia - Gemona del Friuli - Udine
Regional services (Treno regionale) Tarvisio - Carnia - Gemona del Friuli - Udine - Cervignano del Friuli - Trieste

Bus services
Tarvisio Boscoverde - Tarvisio Citta

See also

History of rail transport in Italy
List of railway stations in Friuli-Venezia Giulia
Rail transport in Italy
Railway stations in Italy

References

 This article is based upon a translation of the Italian language version as of February 2016.

External links

Railway stations in Friuli-Venezia Giulia